John Charles Hinderaker  (born 1968) is a United States district judge of the United States District Court for the District of Arizona.

Education 

Hinderaker earned his Bachelor of Arts in Business Economics, with honors, from the University of California, Santa Barbara in 1991 and his Juris Doctor, magna cum laude, from the University of Arizona College of Law in 1996, where he was a member of the Arizona Law Review.

Career 

Upon graduation from law school, Hinderaker served as a law clerk to Judge John Roll and Magistrate Judge Raymond T. Terlizzi, both of the United States District Court for the District of Arizona. He was hired as an associate at the law firm of Lewis Roca Rothgerber Christie in Tucson, Arizona in 1998 and became a partner in 2003, where his practice focused on commercial litigation.

State judicial service 

From 2018 to 2020, he served as a Judge on the Pima County Superior Court after being appointed by Governor Doug Ducey. He was appointed to fill the vacancy caused by the elevation of Judge Sean Brearcliffe to the Arizona Court of Appeals. His tenure on the state court bench ended when he became a Federal district judge.

Federal judicial service 

On November 6, 2019, President Donald Trump announced his intent to nominate Hinderaker to serve as a United States district judge for the United States District Court for the District of Arizona. On December 2, 2019, his nomination was sent to the Senate. He was recommended to Trump by Senator Kyrsten Sinema. While Hinderaker is a Democrat, he was appointed as a district judge by a Republican Governor. President Trump nominated Hinderaker to the seat vacated by Judge Raner Collins, who assumed senior status on March 4, 2019. A hearing on his nomination before the Senate Judiciary Committee was held on December 4, 2019. On March 5, 2020, his nomination was reported out of committee by a 16–6 vote. On September 23, 2020, the United States Senate invoked cloture on his nomination by a 71–26 vote. His nomination was confirmed later that day by a 70–27 vote. He received his judicial commission on September 29, 2020.

References

External links 
 

|-

1968 births
Living people
20th-century American lawyers
21st-century American lawyers
21st-century American judges
Arizona lawyers
Arizona state court judges
James E. Rogers College of Law alumni
Judges of the United States District Court for the District of Arizona
Lawyers from Tucson, Arizona
People from Indio, California
Superior court judges in the United States
United States district court judges appointed by Donald Trump
University of California, Santa Barbara alumni